The Y is a river in the north of Russia. It flows in the territory of Arkhangelsk Oblast and the Komi Republic roughly east from its source in Verkhnetoyemsky District. The Y is a left tributary of the Vashka.

References

Rivers of Arkhangelsk Oblast
Rivers of the Komi Republic